Zhang Junjiu (born August 1940) is a Chinese politician. He was an alternate member of the 14th Central Committee of the Chinese Communist Party and a member of the 15th and 16th Central Committee of the Chinese Communist Party. He was a member of the Standing Committee of the 10th and 11th Chinese People's Political Consultative Conference.

Biography
Zhang was born in Funan County, Anhui, in August 1940. In 1961, he entered Beijing Institute of Technology, majoring in tank design. He joined the Chinese Communist Party (CCP) in November 1964. After university in 1968, he was assigned to the Fifth Ministry of Machine Building. In 1982, he became deputy factory director of the 617 Factory of the Ministry of Ordnance Industry, rising to factory director in 1984. In 1988, he became deputy general manager of China North Industries Group (CNGC), but having held the position for only two years. He served as deputy general manager of China North Industries Corporation in 1990, and three years later promoted to the general manager position. In March 1998, he was appointed deputy director of the Commission for Science, Technology and Industry for National Defense, a post he kept only ten months. In January 1999, he was chosen as vice president and party branch secretary of the All-China Federation of Trade Unions, concurrently serving as first secretary of its secretariat.

References

1940 births
Living people
People from Funan County
Beijing Institute of Technology alumni
People's Republic of China politicians from Anhui
Chinese Communist Party politicians from Anhui
Alternate members of the 14th Central Committee of the Chinese Communist Party
Members of the 15th Central Committee of the Chinese Communist Party
Members of the 16th Central Committee of the Chinese Communist Party
Members of the Standing Committee of the 10th Chinese People's Political Consultative Conference
Members of the Standing Committee of the 11th Chinese People's Political Consultative Conference